Indian Ink Theatre Company is a New Zealand theatre company founded by actor Jacob Rajan  (b. 1966) and director/writer Justin Lewis (b. 1967). Founded in 1996, Indian Ink's first theatrical production was Krishnan's Dairy, which went on to win the Chapman Tripp Award for Production of the Year (1997). The following year Krishnan's Dairy presented in the bigger theatre Downstage Theatre and was so popular the season was extended by five shows. Over the years Indian Inks productions have been toured through New Zealand and overseas with presentations including Krishnan's Dairy, The Candlestick Maker, and The Pickle King. Their most recent production is Mrs Krishnan's Party (2019).

Kiss the Fish (2013) was heavily influenced by Balinese masks and gamelan and Rajan and Lewis had studied in Indonesia. The original title of the play was Monkeys and Men.

Plays
"Krishnan's Dairy", 1997
"The Candlestickmaker", 2000
"The Pickle King", 2002
"The Dentist's Chair", 2008
"Guru of Chai", 2010
"Kiss the Fish", 2013
"The Elephant Thief", 2015
"Welcome to the Murder House", 2018
"Mrs Krishnan's Party", 2019
"Paradise or the Impermanence of Ice Cream", 2021

Awards
1997: Chapman Tripp Theatre Awards, Production of the Year: Krishnan's Dairy 
1999: Edinburgh Festival Fringe First Award: "Krishnan's Dairy"
2010: Chapman Tripp Theatre Awards, New New Zealand Play of the Year: "The Pickle King"
2014: Chapman Tripp Theatre Awards, New New Zealand Play of the Year: "Guru of Chai"

References

Further reading 
Forster, Michelanne and Vivienne Plumb (eds). "Twenty New Zealand Playwrights". Playmarket. Wellington, New Zealand. 2013.

Theatre companies in New Zealand
1996 establishments in New Zealand